Hindman Settlement School is a settlement school located in Hindman, Kentucky in Knott County. Established in 1902, it was the first rural settlement school in America.

Mission
The mission of Hindman Settlement School is "to provide educational and service opportunities for the people of the mountains, while keeping them mindful of their heritage."

Notable staff

James Still
James Still was a notable poet, folklorist, and novelist during his life, spanning 95 years from 1906 to 2001. James Still's friend, Don West offered him a job organizing recreational programs for a settlement school in Knott County, Kentucky. James Still gladly accepted the invitation to teach in Knott County. James Still soon became a librarian at the Hindman Settlement School Library and spent the rest of his days in Knott County. James Still is buried on the Hindman Settlement School Campus.

Fred Williams
Fred Williams was principal at Hindman Settlement School in the mid-1940s. A close friend of Mohandas Karamchand Gandhi, Williams was a Methodist missionary who pioneered indoor and running water sanitation in rural India (Asansol) and fought to eradicate caste-based discrimination.

Marie Stewart Museum & Craft Shop
The Marie Stewart Museum & Craft Shop supports the activities of the school.  The store sells traditional Appalachian crafts and has an online site.  Upstairs is a small museum with exhibits about the Hindman Settlement School and regional crafts.

The school and the study of folksong
The School's goal of integrating traditional culture with education led it to welcome visiting outsiders who sought to document the musical heritage of the Appalachians, notably in folk song. The fieldwork teams of Loraine Wyman with Howard Brockway, and Cecil Sharp with Maud Karpeles, working in the years of the First World War, found a wealth of beautiful melody and texts from singers at the School or from the local neighborhood.

See also
 Pine Mountain Settlement School

References

Further reading
 Jess Stoddart. 2002. Challenge and Change in Appalachia: The Story of Hindman Settlement School. University Press of Kentucky. 
 Katherine Pettit, Jess Stoddart, and May Stone. 1997. The Quare Women's Journals: May Stone & Katherine Pettit's Summers in the Kentucky Mountains and the Founding of Hindman Settlement School. Jesse Stuart Foundation.

External links
 

Settlement schools
Arts centers in Kentucky
Appalachian culture in Kentucky
Educational institutions established in 1902
Museums in Knott County, Kentucky
History museums in Kentucky
Education museums in the United States
1902 establishments in Kentucky
Hindman, Kentucky
Schools in Knott County, Kentucky